Allcroft is a surname. Notable people with the surname include:

 Britt Allcroft (1943-2021), English-American producer, writer, and director
 John Derby Allcroft (1822–1893), English entrepreneur and politician 
 Philip Magnus-Allcroft (1906–1988), British biographer

See also
 Alcroft